Julaki  Rural District is a rural district (dehestan) in Jayezan District, Omidiyeh County, Khuzestan Province, Iran. At the 2011 census, its population was 5,413, in 1,264 families.  The  district has 8 villages.

References 

Rural Districts of Khuzestan Province
Aghajari County